The following is a list of radio stations in Belgium.

Public broadcasters 
Belgium has three public broadcasters, one for each national language.
 The Vlaamse Radio- en Televisieomroeporganisatie (VRT) for the Dutch-speaking Flemish Community (Flanders)
 The Radio Télévision Belge Francophone (RTBF) for the French Community of Belgium (Wallonia and Brussels)
 The Belgischer Rundfunk (BRF) for the German-speaking Community of Belgium (East Cantons)

List of FM radio services by community 
The following is a list of FM radio stations broadcasting in Belgium. There is also DAB+ coverage in many parts of Belgium, with most of the DAB+ stations being available on FM as well.

The Flemish Community

The French Community

Public (RTBF)
 La Première
 VivaCité
 VivaBruxelles (local programs in Brussels)
 VivaCité (local programs in Liège, Wavre, Namur, Mons, Luxembourg and Charleroi)
 Classic 21
 Tipik (formerly Pure FM)
 Musiq'3

DAB+
 Jam.
 Viva+
 RTBF Mix (mix of La Première, Classic 21 and VivaCité in Flanders)

Nationwide
 Bel RTL
 Radio Contact
 Fun Radio
 Nostalgie Wallonie
 NRJ
 Twizz Radio

Regional stations
 Antipode (Walloon Brabant)
 Maximum FM (Liège)
 Must FM (Luxembourg, Namur)
 Radio KIF (Brussels)
 Sud Radio (Hainaut)
 Vibration FM (Brussels)

Local stations
 Fréquence Eghezée (Eghezée, Province de Namur)
 Radio Quartz (Sombreffe, Province de Namur)
 48FM (Liège)
 Ultrason (Nivelles)
 YouFM (Mons)
 Hit Radio (Namur)
 Warm (Liège)

The German Community

Public (BRF)
 BRF 1
 BRF 2
 BRF-DLF (Brussels)

Regional stations
 100.5 Das Hitradio (East Cantons)
 Radio Contact (East Cantons)
 Fantasy Dance FM (East Cantons)
 Radio 700 (East Cantons)
 Radio Sunshine (East Cantons)

Other languages

English language 
 AFN Benelux (Everberg) and nearby: 101.7 MHz FM and online (Mons) : 104.2 MHz FM
 BBC World Service  (Brussels) region and Flanders : DAB+ Block 11A 216.928 MHz and online

Turkish language 
 Gold FM Brussels region : 106.1 FM and online

Arabic language 
 AraBel FM Brussels and surroundings : 106.8 MHz FM and online (70% French and 30% Arabic)

Spanish language 
 Radio Alma Brussels and surroundings : 101.9 MHz FM and online (mixture of French and Mediterranean languages : Spanish, Italian, Greek, Portuguese)

Italian language 
 Radio Italia Charleroi : 105.2 MHz FM and online

External links

Station listings for Belgium 

Radio stations in Belgium (Radiomap.eu)
FMLIST database of FM stations (select country "BEL" after logging in or continuing as guest)
FMSCAN radio reception prediction (enter a location and start generating a stations list)

For Wallonia 

tuner.be (Radio/Fréquences FM section)

Belgium
Radio stations in Belgium